Adolf Krause (born 25 November 1936) is a German field hockey player. He competed in the men's tournament at the 1964 Summer Olympics.

References

External links
 

1936 births
Living people
German male field hockey players
Olympic field hockey players of the United Team of Germany
Field hockey players at the 1964 Summer Olympics
Sportspeople from Brandenburg